The 1961 Polish Speedway season was the 1961 season of motorcycle speedway in Poland.

Individual

Polish Individual Speedway Championship
The 1961 Individual Speedway Polish Championship was held on 24 September at Rzeszow.

Golden Helmet
The 1961 Golden Helmet organised by the Polish Motor Union (PZM) was the inaugural event for leagues 12 leading riders.

Calendar

Final classification
Note: Result from final score was subtracted with two the weakest events.

Team

Team Speedway Polish Championship
The 1961 Team Speedway Polish Championship was the 14th edition of the Team Polish Championship. 

Stal Rzeszów won the gold medal for the second consecutive season.

First League

Second League

Play off
 Tarnów v Gdańsk 34:44, 28:48

References

Poland Individual
Poland Team
Speedway
1961 in Polish speedway